Dee Hsu (born 14 June 1978), more commonly known as Xiǎo S or Little S (小S), is a Taiwanese television host, actress, and singer, also formerly a ballroom dancer. Hsu is well known for her quick-witted caustic humor. From 2004 to 2015, she co-hosted Kangsi Coming with Kevin Tsai. The pair were awarded Best Host in a Variety Programme at the 40th Golden Bell Awards in 2005.

Life and career 
Hsu was born in Taipei, Taiwan on 14 June 1978, she was the youngest of the three sisters, with the eldest being Hsu Si-hsien, and the second elder sister being Barbie Hsu.

Hsu sang in a duo with her sister Barbie Hsu, called "S.O.S." (Sisters of Shu). Due to copyright issues with music labels, the group's name was changed to A.S.O.S. (All Sisters of Shu) in the late 90s.

Since 1999, Hsu and her sister gradually put their singing career to rest. Hsu went on to host various TV programs, including GUESS and Kangsi Coming (康熙來了), which she joined in 2004, and has since been a top host/comedian in Taiwan. She also worked as a spokesperson for Shiatzy Chen.

In 2004, Hsu collaborated with Show Lo, her then co-host on 100% Entertainment, on a duet "戀愛達人" (Love Expert) and co-starred with Luo in the music video. The track was released on Luo's second album Expert Show.

In 2014, Hsu returned to her singing career and published her first EP album "Elephant DEE" under her new stage name Elephant DEE. The EP includes 5 songs. Dee Hsu wrote 4 songs including the lyrics and the rhythm, and 1 song called 心臟噴血 is written by her sister Barbie Hsu.

Personal life 
Hsu dated Micky Huang for four years until their controversial breakup in 2000 at the height of Huang's popularity. Her words to the media then which painted Huang to be the bad guy, derailed his career amidst controversy that Bowie Tsang was the third party. Hsu has proclaimed publicly that Huang is the ex-boyfriend she loved the most.

Hsu married Taiwanese businessman Mike Hsu in 2005. They have three daughters, Elly, Lily and Alice.

In August 2013, Hsu, her husband and her father-in-law (Xu Qing Xiang), were sued after being involved in the bread store chain "Pang Da Ren" scandal.

Filmography

Variety show

Television series

Film

Voice dub

Awards ceremony host

Awards and nominations

Golden Bell Awards 

|-
| 2004
| Say Yes Enterprise
| Best Supporting Actress
| 
|-
| 2005
| rowspan=4 |Kangsi Coming
| rowspan=5|Best Host in a Variety Show
| 
|-
| 2006
| 
|-
| 2007
| 
|-
| 2008
| 
|-
| 2022
|Dee's Talk
|

References

External links 

 
  Dee Hsu's Sina Microblog

Living people
1978 births
Actresses from Taipei
Taiwanese Buddhists
Taiwanese television personalities
21st-century Taiwanese actresses